Adelpha plesaure, the pleasure sister, is a species of butterfly of the family Nymphalidae.

Description
The uppersides of the wings are generally deep brown. The anterior wings have a large orange patch, while the hindwings are crossed by a broad white band. The undersides are pale chocolate colour, crossed by several white bands, with brown edges.

Distribution
This species can be found in Guyana, Bolivia and Brazil.

Subspecies
A. p. plesaure (Brazil)
A. p. phliassa (Godart, 1824) (French Guiana, Suriname, Brazil, Peru, Bolivia)
A. p. pseudomalea Hall, 1938 (Venezuela)
A. p. symona Kaye, 1925 (Trinidad)

References
"Adelpha Hübner, [1819]" at Markku Savela's Lepidoptera and Some Other Life Forms

External links
Adelpha plesaure
Neotropical butterflies

Adelpha
Fauna of Brazil
Nymphalidae of South America
Taxa named by Jacob Hübner
Butterflies described in 1823